Aparisyon is a 2012 Philippine psychological drama film written and directed by Isabel Sandoval. Set in early 1970s, where the story about the nuns in the period immediately preceding the declaration of martial law by Ferdinand Marcos. It is one of the official entries for the New Breed Full Length Feature Category in Cinemalaya 2012.

Aparisyon was invited to film festivals around the world, including Deauville Asian Film Festival, where it won the Audience Award. At the Hawaii International Film Festival, the film won the NETPAC Award "for its courageous exploration of religious faith, guilt and forgiveness through masterful storytelling and visual imagery". The film was also nominated for the New Currents Award at the 2012 Busan International Film Festival.

As of 2021, along with Señorita, it is available for streaming through the Criterion Channel.

Synopsis
Set in 1971, the sisters of the Adoration monastery in a remote town in Rizal in the Philippines lead quiet and peaceful lives. Remy (Mylene Dizon), an extern nun who is able to leave the monastery from time to time to do errands for the other nuns, learns from her mother that her activist brother is missing. She asks Mother Superior Ruth (Cuyugan-Asensio) for an indefinite leave of absence to help her family search for her brother. When her request is turned down, she starts secretly attending meetings of families with missing relatives. Lourdes (Jodi Sta. Maria) becomes an extern too to go with Remy to attend a meeting. They fall victim to violence on their way back.

Cast
Jodi Sta. Maria as Sister Lourdes
Mylene Dizon as Sister Remy
Fides Cuyugan-Asensio as Mother Superior
Raquel Villavicencio as Sister Vera
Maria Monica Reyes as Sister Emilia

Awards

References

Notes

External links
 

Philippine psychological drama films
Films set in 1971
2012 films
2010s Tagalog-language films
2010s psychological drama films
Films about Catholic nuns